Los Berros (Spanish for The Watercresses) is a census-designated place in San Luis Obispo County, California. The 2010 United States census reported Los Berros's population was 641.

Geography
According to the United States Census Bureau, the CDP covers an area of 2.5 square miles (6.5 km2), all of it land.

Demographics
The 2010 United States Census reported that Los Berros had a population of 641. The racial makeup of Los Berros was 527 (82.2%) White, 4 (0.6%) African American, 1 (0.2%) Native American, 12 (1.9%) Asian, 1 (0.2%) Pacific Islander, 45 (7.0%) from other races, and 51 (8.0%) from two or more races. Hispanic or Latino of any race were 153 persons (23.9%).

The Census reported that 638 people (99.5% of the population) lived in households, 3 (0.5%) lived in non-institutionalized group quarters, and 0 (0%) were institutionalized.

There were 211 households, out of which 84 (39.8%) had children under the age of 18 living in them, 143 (67.8%) were opposite-sex married couples living together, 16 (7.6%) had a female householder with no husband present, 4 (1.9%) had a male householder with no wife present.  There were 9 (4.3%) unmarried opposite-sex partnerships, and 4 (1.9%) same-sex married couples or partnerships. 35 households (16.6%) were made up of individuals, and 20 (9.5%) had someone living alone who was 65 years of age or older. The average household size was 3.02.  There were 163 families (77.3% of all households); the average family size was 3.43.

The population was spread out, with 174 people (27.1%) under the age of 18, 36 people (5.6%) aged 18 to 24, 130 people (20.3%) aged 25 to 44, 187 people (29.2%) aged 45 to 64, and 114 people (17.8%) who were 65 years of age or older.  The median age was 40.8 years. For every 100 females, there were 90.2 males.  For every 100 females age 18 and over, there were 91.4 males.

The homeowner vacancy rate was 0.7%; the rental vacancy rate was 5.6%.  428 people (66.8% of the population) lived in owner-occupied housing units and 210 people (32.8%) lived in rental housing units.

References

Census-designated places in San Luis Obispo County, California
Census-designated places in California